Legion Arena is a computer wargame developed by Slitherine Strategies. It allows the player to play as several tribes during the rise of the Roman Empire. The player can play as the Latin tribes, the Celts and the Romans. It is published by Black Bean Games in Europe and Strategy First in North America for Windows.

Release
The game was announced on June 30, 2004. A OS X port by Freeverse was announced on January 12, 2006. In 2006, an expansion to Legion Arena was released under the title of Legion Arena: Cult of Mithras. It incorporated mythical elements into the base game.

Reception

Legion Arena received mixed reviews from critics upon release. On Metacritic, the game holds a score of 65/100 based on 20 reviews, indicating "mixed or average reviews". On GameRankings, the game holds a score of 68.23% based on 22 reviews.

See also
Legion

References

External links
 Legion Arena homepage
 Legion Arena old homepage
 Freeverse: Legion Arena

2005 video games
Black Bean Games games
Computer wargames
Freeverse Inc. games
MacOS games
Multiplayer and single-player video games
Role-playing video games
Strategy First games
Tactical role-playing video games
Video games developed in the United Kingdom
Video games set in antiquity
Video games set in the Roman Empire
Video games with expansion packs
Windows games